= Darin Weerasinghe =

Sri Lankan powerlifter and racing car driver

Darin Weerasinghe is a Sri Lankan powerlifter and racing car driver. He is a seven-time national powerlifting champion, and he has won events as a race driver. He has a sponsorship agreement and partnership venture with United Tractor and Equipment.

== Career ==
He was runner-up at the 2015 SLARDAR-AMRC Tarmac Championships, which was held at the Katukurunda race track on 31 May 2015. Weerasinghe drove his Subaru STI X during the course of the SLARDAR-AMRC Tarmac Championships. Weerasinghe qualified with the fastest time, so he commenced the race from Pole position 1, vying with 19 other compatriots for the title. He also emerged victorious at the 2015 Drag Racing Championship organised by the Ceylon Motor Sports Club. Weerasinghe drove his Nissan GTR for the 2015 Drag Racing Championship event to claim the title. He won the 2016 CEAT Southern Eliyakanda Hill Climb and retained the Preethi Palliyaguru trophy driving the Subaru WRX STI X 2000cc.

In powerlifting at national level, he won a record number of national titles in Sri Lanka. He captained the Sri Lankan contingent at the 2017 Asian Powerlifting Championships and took part in the heavyweight category of 120 kg+. He won gold medal at the 2017 Commonwealth Powerlifting Championships in the over 120 kg open class category, and he was guaranteed of the gold medal following a lift of 205 kg in the bench press.

He also won a gold medal in the 2019 Commonwealth Powerlifting Championships. During the 2019 Commonwealth Powerlifting Championships, he won a gold medal in the 120 kg + class with a 260 kg squat, 210 kg bench press and a 262.5 kg deadlift for a total of 732.5 kg. His bench press performance during the 2019 Commonwealth Powerlifting Championships was also recognised as the national record in bench press and Weerasinghe became the recipient as the Sri Lankan national record holder in bench press. He also won the Asian Bench Press Championships in 2023. In December 2023, he competed at the 2023 Asian Powerlifting Championships and secured a silver medal.

In October 2024, he was chosen as one of the competitors to represent Sri Lanka at the 2024 edition of the World Masters Powerlifting Championships which was held in South Africa. He competed in the 120 kg Equip Master Category 1 classification criteria during the 2024 World Powerlifting Championships and he eventually became the first ever Sri Lankan to compete at the World Masters Powerlifting Championships.
